The Admirable class was one of the largest and most successful classes of minesweepers ordered by the United States Navy during World War II.  Typically, minesweepers detected and removed naval mines before the rest of the fleet arrived, thereby ensuring safe passage for the larger ships. They were also charged with anti-submarine warfare (ASW) duties with rear-mounted depth charge racks and a forward-firing Hedgehog antisubmarine mortar.  Their job was essential to the safety and success of U.S. naval operations during World War II and the Korean War. These minesweepers were also employed as patrol vessel and convoy escorts.

The  of patrol craft escorts was based on the Admirable-class design.

Service in other Navies

As a part of Project Hula – a secret 1945 program that transferred 149 U.S. Navy ships to the Soviet Navy at Cold Bay, Territory of Alaska, in anticipation of the Soviet Union joining the war against Japan – the U.S. Navy transferred 24 Admirable-class minesweepers to the Soviet Navy between May and August 1945. At least some of them saw action in the Soviet offensive against Japanese forces in Northeast Asia in August 1945. The Soviet Union never returned them to the United States.

After World War II, the United States transferred Admirable-class minesweepers to the Republic of China Navy, the Republic of Chinas Chinese Maritime Customs Service, the Republic of Korea Navy, the Republic of Vietnam Navy, and the Dominican, Mexican, Myanmar, and Philippine navies.

 survives as a museum ship on dry land in Omaha, Nebraska.  was a museum ship on the Mississippi River in St. Louis, until she sank during the Great Flood of 1993.
 was scuttled off the coast of Cozumel, Mexico in 1999. It is now a popular site for scuba diving.

Production

 Tampa Shipbuilding Company, Tampa, FL (24)
  ... 
  ... 
 Willamette Iron and Steel Works, Portland, OR (23)
  ... 
  ... 
 Savannah Machine & Foundry, GA (9)
  ... 
 Winslow Marine Railway and Shipbuilding Company, Puget Sound, WA (13)
  ... 
  ... 
 Gulf Shipbuilding Madisonville, LA (16)
  ... 
 General Engineering & Dry Dock Company, Alameda, CA (7)
  ... 
 Associated Shipbuilders, Puget Sound, WA (14)
  ... 
  ... 
 American Ship Building Company, Lorain, OH (17)
  ... 
  ...

Engines

 Two 855shp ALCO 539 diesel engines, Farrel-Birmingham single reduction gear, two shafts. (30)
 AM-136 ... AM-165
 Two 855shp Cooper Bessemer GSB-8 diesel engines, National Supply Co. single reduction gear, two shafts (84)
 AM-214 ... AM-226, AM-232 ... AM-235, AM-240 ... AM-242
 AM-246 ... AM-291, AM-294 ... AM-311
 Two 855shp Busch-Sulzer 539 diesel engines, Farrel Birmingham single reduction gear, two shafts (9)
 AM-356, AM-357, AM-359, AM-361 ... AM-366
 ref:

See also
List of Admirable-class minesweepers

References
( http://shipbuildinghistory.com/smallships/minesweepers1.htm
 http://shipbuildinghistory.com/shipyards/small/willamette.htm
 http://shipbuildinghistory.com/shipyards/large/tasco.htm
 http://www.shipbuildinghistory.com/shipyards/small/savannah.htm

External links
 

Mine warfare vessel classes
 
 Admirable